The 1939 Bucknell Bison football team was an American football team that represented Bucknell University as an independent during the 1939 college football season. In their third season under head coach Al Humphreys, the Bison compiled a 3–5 record and outscored opponents by a total of 88 to 64.

The team played its home games at Memorial Stadium in Lewisburg, Pennsylvania.

Schedule

References

Bucknell
Bucknell Bison football seasons
Bucknell Bison football